Morgan Alexander may refer to:
 Morgan Alexander (bobsleigh)
 Morgan Alexander (racing driver)

See also
 Alexander Morgan (disambiguation)